The 1901–02 season was the third season for FC Barcelona.

Events
The first game of the season was a friendly against Hispania AC which ended in a 1–0 victory thanks to a goal from Joan Gamper. The following game was the first at camp de la Carretera d'Horta, and Gamper contributed decisively once again with a hat-trick to help his side to a 4–0 win over the crew of Calliope.

A few months later, Barça won the first official piece of silverware, the 1901–02 Copa Macaya. In the eight games played in the tournament, Barça only conceded two goals, in a 2–4 win over Hispania on 6 January 1902, and scored a resounding 60 goals, 15 of which came on the final matchday in a 15–0 victory over Català SC on 23 March 1902, with Udo Steinberg netting 6 goals, and Joan Gamper and Arthur Leask clutching a hat-trick each.

Coinciding with the festivities of the coronation of King Alfonso XIII, the president of the recently established Madrid FC, the Catalan Juan Padrós, had the idea of organizing the first national championship, the Copa de la Coronación. It was contested in Madrid, and five teams participated: Barça, Club Español (now RCD Espanyol), Madrid FC (now Real Madrid), New Club and Club Vizcaya. The competition featured the first recorded game between Barcelona and Madrid FC on 13 May 1902, with the Blaugrana emerging as 3–1 winners, courtesy of goals from Steinberg and Gamper. Barça reached the final of the championship, where they were defeated by Bizcaya 2–1.

Squad

Matches

 1 Eckes, played his last game for the club as a goalkeeper.
 2 Second match for Barcelona on the same day.

External links
  Official Site

References

FC Barcelona seasons
Barcelona
Bar